B Studios is an Indian film production and distribution company headed by Bala. In the recent past, B Studios has financed several of Bala's directorial ventures, and other films by filmmakers including Mysskin and Sarkunam.

History 
In September 2004, director Bala revealed that he had launched his own production house, B Studios, to "give opportunity for new talent". He announced his intentions of producing two films a year and also venturing into ad films. Subsequently, the first venture was Maayavi (2005) directed by Singampuli, a comedy film starring Suriya and Jyothika in the lead roles. As a result of their association in Naan Kadavul in late 2005, B Studios agreed to produce Ajith Kumar's Paramasivan (2006), but later opted out. B Studios were also briefly involved with the production of Vishnuvardhan's Sarvam (2009) during June 2006, when the film was announced with Suriya and Ileana D'Cruz in the lead roles. Initially planned as a co-production with Studio Green, the film failed to progress and was released with different makers and a different cast in 2009.

Following the release of Naan Kadavul in early 2009, Bala announced that he would finance another film with Suriya for director Singampuli and a film with Jayam Ravi for Aacharya Ravi, but neither materialised. Bala has since financed his own projects, as well as individual films from Mysskin and Sarkunam.

Filmography

References

Film distributors of India
Film production companies based in Chennai
Indian film studios
2004 establishments in Tamil Nadu
Indian companies established in 2004
Mass media companies established in 2004